Jerry Pillay is a Reformed pastor, member of the Uniting Presbyterian Church in Southern Africa, professor of theology at the University of Pretoria where he heads the Department of History and Ecclesiology and is Dean of the Faculty of Theology and Religion. He was elected president of the World Communion of Reformed Churches (WCRC) in 2010 and, in June 2022, General Secretary of the World Council of Churches (WCC), to take office on 1 January 2023.

Biography 
Pillay was born in 1965 into a family of Indian origin who had been in South Africa for five generations.

With a pastoral vocation from childhood, he holds a Bachelor of Divinity (Honours) from the University of Durban-Westville (1986), a Master of Arts in Missiology and Church History from the University of Durban-Westville (1988) and a Ph.D in Church History and New Testament from the University of Cape Town (2002) focused on social development.

Initially a proposing pastor at McDonald Memorial Presbyterian Church in Amanzimtoti from1987 to 1989, he then served as pastor at Lotus Park Presbyterian Church in Durban, then at Bridgetown Presbyterian Church in Cape, then at St Andrew's Presbyterian Church in Benoni from 1998 to 2008.

Moderator and then general secretary of the United Presbyterian Church of South Africa, a member of the central committee of the South African Council of Churches (SACC), he was elected president of the World Communion of Reformed Churches (WCRC) on 24 June 2010. He is also a member of the World Missionary Council (WMC), an international body based in London.

On 17 June 2022, he was elected general secretary of the World Council of Churches (WCC).

Published works 
Pillay is the author of some 30 articles, relating to church history, missiology, or other topics, published mostly between 2015 and 2021.

Distinctions 
Pillay holds an honorary doctorate in theology from the University of Debrecen in Hungary.

References

Sources
Translated from the French Wikipedia Jerry Pillay page (30 June 2022 version)

1965 births
Living people
Protestant theologians
University of Cape Town alumni
People of the World Council of Churches
South African clergy